William Rathbone was launched at Liverpool in 1809 as a West Indiaman. During her career she recaptured a British vessel, and was herself captured by an American privateer, but quickly recaptured by the Royal Navy. Later she traded with Africa, and eventually Calcutta. She burnt at sea in May 1846 when a cargo of jute underwent spontaneous combustion.

Career
Captain Archibald Kennan acquired a letter of marque on 30 October 1809. William Rathbone first appeared in Lloyd's Register (LR) with Kinnan, master, Tobin & Co., owners, and trade Liverpool–Demerara.

William Rathbone rescued Hugos crew after they had abandoned her. Hugo had been on a voyage from Honduras to London when she had sprung a leak. William Rathbone was coming from Demerara.

On 5 November 1811 Captain Lawrence Hall acquired a letter of marque on 5 November 1811.

On 24 November the French privateer Bristnair, of Saint-Malo, and of 14 guns and 160 men, captured Mary, which was sailing from Newfoundland to Ireland. William Rathbone recaptured Mary and sent her into Liverpool. Mary arrived at Liverpool on 3 December.

Captain Francis Darnoult acquired a letter of marque on 20 June 1812. On 27 September, as William Rathbone was approaching Demerary Bar, the American privateer Saucy Jack captured her. However,  recaptured William Rathbone on 8 October. She arrived at St Thomas on 12 October. William Rathbone had been armed with 14 guns and had a crew of 30 men. The Americans put a prize crew aboard. When Charybdis recaptured William Rathbone she returned the vessel to her officers and crew.

On 29 December 1815 William Rathbone, King, master, from Cape Henry, Virginia, to St. Domingo, got on shore near Liverpool. She filled with water and fell on her side but was expected to be gotten off. She was refloated and beached in the River Mersey on 3 January 1816.

On 17 April 1818 William Rathbone put into Corunna due to "stress of weather". She was 10 days into a voyage from Liverpool to Demerara. In 1819 she underwent repairs for damages.

On 1 April 1821 William Rathbone put into Lisbon leaky and having lost her bulwarks. She had been on a voyage from Africa to Liverpool. There she landed her cargo and she was surveyed.

William Rathbone underwent a thorough repair and lengthening in 1845. In 1846 her master was Hesoason and her owner was Agett & Co. Her trade was Liverpool–Calcutta.

Fate
She sank the next day.  rescued her crew. LR for 1846 carried the notation "LOST". The fire was attributed to spontaneous combustion in her hold of her cargo of jute.

Notes, citations, and references
Notes

Citations

References
 

1809 ships
Age of Sail merchant ships of England
Captured ships
Maritime incidents in 1815
Maritime incidents in May 1846